Percy Tasman "Jim" Park (25 February 1875 – 14 June 1919) was an Australian rules footballer who played with Essendon and St Kilda in the Victorian Football League (VFL).		
		
A solicitor by profession, he moved to Mildura at the turn of the century. He died from pneumonia in June 1919.

References

External links 
		

1875 births
1919 deaths
Australian rules footballers from Victoria (Australia)
Essendon Football Club players
St Kilda Football Club players
Carlton Football Club (VFA) players
Deaths from pneumonia in Victoria (Australia)